Udai Manikya I (died 1572), also known as Gopi Prasad, was the Maharaja of Tripura from 1567 to 1572. Though from a lowly background, he later rose to become one of the most powerful figures in the kingdom. Following the death of the previous monarch, his son-in-law, Udai took royal power himself, for a time supplanting the ruling dynasty with his own line.

Life
Originally named Gopi Prasad, he was of humble origins. He began his career during the reign of Vijaya Manikya II, serving as a gomasta (rent-collector) in Dharmanagar, though was later driven out of this position after having climbed a tree belonging to a Brahmin. Thereafter, he was appointed as a cook in the royal kitchens, then a chowkidar, before ultimately rising to become Commander-in-Chief of the Tripura army. His influence further increased when Vijaya, wishing to ensure the ambitious officer's loyalty, married his own son to the latter's daughter, Ratnavati.

Upon the ascension of his son-in-law, Ananta Manikya, to the throne in 1563, Gopi Prasad expanded his already extensive power, keeping the new king completely under his control. This arrangement proved to be short-lived, when, in 1567, Ananta died under uncertain circumstances. According to differing versions of the Rajmala, this was either the result of a fever or through strangulation on Gopi Prasad's orders. Regardless, the latter subsequently claimed royal power and adopted the regnal name Udai Manikya, assuming the erstwhile ruling dynasty's cognomen.

Udai proved to be a talented administrator and renamed the kingdom's capital, changing it from Rangamati to Udaipur after himself. He extensively worked to beautify the city with the construction of buildings, temples and reservoirs, among which were the Chandra Gopinath Temple and the Chandrasagar. He was less successful in warfare however, having become involved in a 5-year-long conflict with Sulaiman Khan Karrani, the Sultan of Bengal, resulting in the heavy loss of money, 40,000 troops and the area of Chittagong.

Tradition states that Udai had 240 wives, several of whom, on charges of infidelity, he had executed through being trampled by elephants or devoured by dogs. Udai himself was poisoned to death in 1572, after having ingested a pill of quicksilver supplied by a certain woman. He was succeeded by his son Joy Manikya I.

Notes

References

Kings of Tripura
History of Tripura
Usurpers
1572 deaths
Murdered Indian monarchs
16th-century murdered monarchs
Deaths by poisoning
Murder in 1572